
Gmina Magnuszew is a rural gmina (administrative district) in Kozienice County, Masovian Voivodeship, in east-central Poland.

Villages
Gmina Magnuszew contains the villages and settlements of Aleksandrów, Anielin, Basinów, Boguszków, Bożówka, Chmielew, Dębowola, Gruszczyn, Grzybów, Kępa Skórecka, Kłoda, Kolonia Rozniszew, Kurki, Latków, Magnuszew, Mniszew, Osiemborów, Ostrów, Przewóz Stary, Przewóz Tarnowski, Przydworzyce, Rękowice, Rozniszew, Trzebień, Tyborów, Wilczkowice Dolne, Wilczowola, Wola Magnuszewska, Wólka Tarnowska, Zagroby, Żelazna Nowa and Żelazna Stara.

Neighbouring gminas
Gmina Magnuszew is bordered by the gminas of Głowaczów, Grabów nad Pilicą, Kozienice, Maciejowice, Warka and Wilga.

References
Polish official population figures 2006

Magnuszew
Kozienice County